Avellino is an Italian surname. Notable people with the surname include:

Andrew Avellino (1521-1608), Italian saint
Giulio Giacinto Avellino (c.1645-c.1700), Italian painter
Natalie Avellino (born 1970), Australian netballer
Onofrio Avellino (c.1764-1741), Italian painter
Salvatore Avellino (born 1935), Italian mobster and caporegime

Italian-language surnames